Federico Ezequiel Turienzo (born 6 February 1983 in La Plata) is an Argentine football player. He is a 6'2" tall, 12 stone striker who currently plays for Villa San Carlos in Argentina.

Turienzo played for Argentine side Gimnasia y Esgrima La Plata from 2002 to August 2005, when he moved to Brighton & Hove Albion, having been recommended to the club by former Juventus star Zibi Boniek, he signed a two-year contract.

External links
 Brighton profile
 Argentine Primera statistics  
 

1983 births
Living people
Footballers from La Plata
Argentine footballers
Argentine expatriate footballers
Serie B players
Club de Gimnasia y Esgrima La Plata footballers
Brighton & Hove Albion F.C. players
S.S. Teramo Calcio players
U.S. Salernitana 1919 players
S.S. Arezzo players
Expatriate footballers in England
Expatriate footballers in Italy
Association football forwards